A cuckoo is a military slang term for a sniper, disguised in a  sprawling tree. This word has been particularly applied to the Finnish Winter War snipers and the World War II German snipers, who took pot-shots at enemy troops from hidden vantage points.

During World War II, before 1944, the German high command left many cuckoos behind as their armies retreated, in order to delay the Soviet rush.

In popular culture
The 2002 Russian film The Cuckoo tells a story of Finnish cuckoo sniper.

See also
List of books, articles and documentaries about snipers

References

Military slang and jargon
Military snipers
Military tactics